Poonam Poonia (born 12 December 1994) is an Indian cricketer who plays for Services. He made his first-class debut on 1 October 2015 in the 2015–16 Ranji Trophy. He made his List A debut for Services in the 2016–17 Vijay Hazare Trophy on 25 February 2017.

References

External links
 

1994 births
Living people
Indian cricketers
Services cricketers
People from Sri Ganganagar